Broken Girl is the debut album by Julie Doiron, released in 1996. The album can be considered eponymous, in that Broken Girl was also the stage name Doiron adopted for this album. All of her subsequent albums, however, have been released under her own name.

Track listing
"Dance Music" - 2:16
"Elevator Show" - 2:20
"Crumble" - 1:33
"Soon, Coming Closer" - 3:04
"August 10" - 2:56
"Taller Beauty" - 2:00
"Grammy" - 2:20
"Grew Smaller" - 2:21
"Happy Lucky Girl" - 1:53
"Sorry Story" - 1:54
"So Low" - 2:55
"Waiting For Baby" - 1:58

References

1996 debut albums
Julie Doiron albums
Sub Pop albums